Mimcochylis is a genus of moths belonging to the family Tortricidae.

Species
Mimcochylis ochroplasta Razowski, 1985
Mimcochylis plagiusa Razowski, 1985
Mimcochylis planola Razowski, 1985
Mimcochylis plasmodia Razowski, 1985

See also
List of Tortricidae genera

References

 , 1985: On the generic groups Saphenista and Cochylis (Tortricidae). Nota Lepidopterologica 8 (1): 55–60.
 , 2011: Diagnoses and remarks on genera of Tortricidae, 2: Cochylini (Lepidoptera: Tortricidae). Shilap Revista de Lepidopterologia 39 (156): 397–414.

External links
tortricidae.com

Cochylini
Tortricidae genera